Orientopsaltria is a genus of cicadas from Southeast Asia. Its distribution encompasses the Malayan Peninsula, Sumatra, Borneo, Palawan and the Philippines.

List of species

Orientopsaltria agatha (Moulton, 1911)
Orientopsaltria alticola (Distant, 1905)
Orientopsaltria angustata Duffels and Zaidi, 2000
Orientopsaltria brooksi (Moulton, 1923)
Orientopsaltria confluens Duffels and Zaidi, 2000
Orientopsaltria duarum (Walker, 1857)
Orientopsaltria fuliginosa (Walker, 1850)
Orientopsaltria guttigera (Walker, 1856)
Orientopsaltria hollowayi Duffels and Zaidi, 2000
Orientopsaltria ida (Moulton, 1911)
Orientopsaltria inermis (Stål, 1870)
Orientopsaltria kinabaluana Duffels and Zaidi, 2000
Orientopsaltria latispina Duffels and Zaidi, 2000
Orientopsaltria maculosa Duffels and Zaidi, 2000
Orientopsaltria montivaga (Distant, 1889)
Orientopsaltria moultoni (China, 1926)
Orientopsaltria noonadani Duffels and Zaidi, 2000
Orientopsaltria padda (Distant, 1887)
Orientopsaltria palawana Duffels and Zaidi, 2000
Orientopsaltria phaeophila (Walker, 1850)
Orientopsaltria ruslani Duffels and Zaidi, 1998
Orientopsaltria saudarapadda Duffels and Zaidi, 1998
Orientopsaltria sumatrana (Moulton, 1917)
Orientopsaltria vanbreei Duffels and Zaidi, 2000

References

Hemiptera of Asia
Taxa named by Masayo Kato
Dundubiini
Cicadidae genera